Saint-Mary de Saint-Mary-le-Cros Church is a French catholic church in the town of Ferrières-Saint-Mary in the Cantal.

Location 
The church overlooks the Alagnon river.

References 

Romanesque architecture in France
Churches in Cantal
19th-century Roman Catholic church buildings in France